Joseph Bradley Varnum (January 29, 1750/1751September 21, 1821) was an American politician from Massachusetts.  He served as a U.S. representative and United States senator, and held leadership positions in both bodies. He was a member of the Democratic-Republican Party.

Born in Dracut in the Province of Massachusetts Bay, Varnum was the son of farmer, militia officer and local official Samuel Varnum and Mary Prime.  He received a limited formal education, but became a self-taught scholar.  Varnum became a farmer, and at age 18 received his commission as a captain in the Massachusetts militia.  He commanded Dracut's militia company during the American Revolution and remained in the militia afterwards, eventually attaining the rank of major general in 1805.

Varnum took part in the government of Massachusetts following independence, including as a member of the Massachusetts House of Representatives from 1780 to 1785 and a member of the Massachusetts State Senate from 1786 to 1795.  Despite not being an attorney, Varnum also served as a judge, including terms as a Justice of the Massachusetts Court of Common Pleas and Chief Justice of the Massachusetts Court of General Sessions.  He was a member of the U.S. House from 1795 to 1811, and was Speaker of the House from 1807 to 1811.  Varnum served in the U.S. Senate from 1811 to 1817, and was the Senate's president pro tempore from 1813 to 1814.

After leaving the U.S. Senate, Varnum served in the Massachusetts State Senate until his death.  He died in Dracut on September 21, 1821, and was buried at Varnum Cemetery in Dracut.

Biography
Joseph Bradley Varnum was born in Dracut, Massachusetts, in Middlesex County, on January 29, 1750, or 1751.

At the age of eighteen, he was commissioned captain by the committee of Massachusetts Bay Colony, and in 1787 colonel by the Commonwealth of Massachusetts. He was made brigadier general in 1802, and in 1805 major general of the state militia, holding the latter office at his death in 1821.

After serving in the Massachusetts militia during the American Revolutionary War, Varnum helped to destroy the Shays insurrection before he was elected to the Massachusetts House of Representatives (1780–1785) and then the Massachusetts State Senate (1786–1795).  He also served as a Justice of the Massachusetts Court of Common Pleas and as Chief Justice of the Massachusetts Court of General Sessions.

In 1794, Varnum was elected to the U.S. House of Representatives, where he served from March 4, 1795, until his resignation on June 29, 1811. During his last four years in the House, he served as its Speaker.

Varnum was elected to the U.S. Senate in 1811 to fill the vacancy in the term. He became the only U.S. Senator from the Democratic-Republican Party in Massachusetts history.

Varnum served as President pro tempore of the U.S. Senate from December 6, 1813, to February 3, 1814, during the Thirteenth Congress. He was also the Chair of the Senate Committee on Militia during the Fourteenth Congress.

After returning to Massachusetts in 1817, Varnum again served in the Massachusetts State Senate, until his death on September 21, 1821.

Varnum died in Dracut, and is interred in Varnum Cemetery in that town.  His brother was Major General James Mitchell Varnum who commanded the 1st Rhode Island Regiment from 1775 to 1777, served as a brigade commander at the Battle of Rhode Island and later served as the major general in command of the Rhode Island Militia.

Slavery

Henry Wilson, in his History of Slavery, quotes Varnum in the debate on the bill for the government of the Mississippi Territory before the United States House of Representatives in March 1798 as having been very strong and outspoken in his opposition to Negro servitude. Varnum developed a strong friendship with Silas Royal, a former slave freed by the Varnum family, who also served with him during the war.

On March 3, 1805, Varnum submitted a Massachusetts Proposition to amend the Constitution
and Abolish the Slave Trade.
This proposition was tabled until 1807, when under Varnum's leadership the amendment moved through Congress and passed both houses on March 2, 1807. President Thomas Jefferson signed it into law on March 3, 1807.

Notes

References

External links

 Varnum, Joseph. “Autobiography of General Joseph B. Varnum.” Edited by James M. Varnum. Magazine of American History 20 (November 1888): 405–14.

Attribution:

1750s births
1821 deaths
Massachusetts militiamen in the American Revolution
Speakers of the United States House of Representatives
Presidents pro tempore of the United States Senate
United States senators from Massachusetts
Democratic-Republican Party United States senators
Members of the Massachusetts House of Representatives
Massachusetts state senators
Democratic-Republican Party members of the United States House of Representatives from Massachusetts
People from Dracut, Massachusetts